UFO conspiracy theories are a subset of conspiracy theories which argue that various governments and politicians globally, in particular the United States Government, are suppressing evidence that unidentified flying objects are controlled by a non-human intelligence or built using alien technology. Such conspiracy theories usually argue that Earth governments are in communication or cooperation with extraterrestrial visitors despite public disclaimers, and further that some of these theories claim that the governments are explicitly allowing alien abduction.

Individuals who have suggested that UFO evidence is being suppressed include United States Senator Barry Goldwater, British Admiral Lord Hill-Norton (former NATO head and chief of the British Defence Staff), American Vice Admiral Roscoe H. Hillenkoetter (first CIA director), Israeli brigadier general Haim Eshed (former director of space programs for the Israel Ministry of Defense), astronauts Gordon Cooper and Edgar Mitchell, and former Canadian Defence Minister Paul Hellyer. Beyond their testimonies and reports they have presented no evidence to substantiate their statements and claims. According to the Committee for Skeptical Inquiry little or no evidence exists to support them despite significant research on the subject by non-governmental scientific agencies.

Scholars of religion have identified some new religious movements among the proponents of UFO conspiracy theories, most notably Heaven's Gate, the Nation of Islam, and Scientology.

Background
Personnel in the mid-1940s reported unidentified objects under various names.

Roswell balloon and 'recovered disc' hoaxes

On July 8, 1947, Roswell Army Air Field issued a press release stating that they had recovered a "flying disc". The Army quickly retracted the statement and clarified that the crashed object was a conventional weather balloon.  The Roswell incident did not surface again until the late 1970s, when it was incorporated into conspiracy literature.

The Roswell balloon was far from the only misidentified "disc".  One potential disc, recovered from the yard of a priest in Grafton, Wisconsin, was identified as an ordinary circular saw-blade.  More elaborate hoax saucers were found in Shreveport, Louisiana; in Black River Falls, Wisconsin; and in Clearwater, Florida.  On July 9, press reported the recovery of a thirty-inch disc from a Hollywood back yard; the hoaxer was never identified.

On July 11, press reported the recovery of a 30-inch disc from the yard of a Twin Falls, Idaho home.  On July 12, it was reported nationally that the Twin Falls disc was a hoax. Photos of the object were publicly released.  The object was described as containing radio tubes, electric coils, and wires underneath a plexiglass dome.   Press reported that four teenagers had confessed to creating the disc.

Chronology of UFO conspiracy theories

1949

Winchell and the Soviets
On April 3, 1949, radio personality Walter Winchell broadcast the claim that it had been definitively established that the flying saucers were guided missiles fired from Russia.  In response, the Air Force denied any such conclusion.  The Air Force reportedly requested an FBI investigation into Winchell's claims, a request that was denied.

Keyhoe and the Air Force knowledge of UFOs

On December 26, 1949,   True magazine published an article by Donald Keyhoe titled "The Flying Saucers Are Real".  Keyhoe, a former Major in the US Marines, claimed that elements within the Air Force knew that saucers existed and had concluded they were likely 'inter-planetary'.

The article  examined the Mantell UFO incident and quoted an unnamed pilot who opined that the Air Force's explanation "looks like a cover up to me".  The Gorman Dogfight and the Chiles-Whitted UFO encounter were also described. The article cited a supposed report from Air Material Command and claimed a "rocket authority at Wright field" had concluded saucers were interplanetary.  Concern over a public panic, of the kind that supposedly occurred after the 1938 War of the Worlds broadcast, is cited in the article as a possible motive for the cover up. Citing historic sources, Keyhoe speculated that similar sightings have likely occurred for at least several centuries.

The True article caused a sensation. Though such figures are always difficult to verify, Captain Edward J. Ruppelt, the first head of Project Blue Book, reported that "It is rumored among magazine publishers that Don Keyhoe's article in True was one of the most widely read and widely discussed magazine articles in history."  When Keyhoe expanded the article into a book, The Flying Saucers Are Real (1950), it sold over half a million copies in paperback.
  
In March 1950, the Air Force denied "flying saucers" exist and further denied that they were US technology being covered-up.

Scully and alien bodies

In October and November 1949, journalist Frank Scully published two columns in Variety, claiming that dead extraterrestrial beings were recovered from a flying saucer crash, based on what he said was reported to him by a scientist involved. In January 1950, Time Magazine skeptically repeated stories of crashed saucers with humanoid occupants.

It was later revealed that Scully had been the victim of "two veteran confidence artists".
In 1952 and 1956, True magazine published articles by San Francisco Chronicle reporter John Philip Cahn that exposed Newton and "Dr. Gee" (identified as Leo A. GeBauer) as oil con artists who had hoaxed Scully.

1950s
The 1950s saw an increase in both governmental and civilian investigative efforts and reports of public disinformation and suppression of evidence.

The UK Ministry of Defence's UFO Project has its roots in a study commissioned in 1950 by the MOD's then Chief Scientific Adviser, radar scientist Henry Tizard. As a result of his insistence that UFO sightings should not be dismissed without some form of proper scientific study, the department set up the Flying Saucer Working Party (or FSWP).

In August 1950, Montanan baseball manager Nicholas Mariana filmed several UFOs with his color 16mm camera. Project Blue Book was called in and, after inspecting the film, Mariana claimed it was returned to him with critical footage removed, clearly showing the objects as disc-shaped. The incident sparked nationwide media attention.

Canadian radio engineer Wilbert B. Smith, who worked for the Canadian Department of Transport, was interested in flying saucer propulsion technology and wondered if the assertions in the just-published Scully and Keyhoe books were factual. In September 1950, he had the Canadian embassy in Washington D.C. arrange contact with U.S. officials to try to discover the truth of the matter. Smith was briefed by Robert Sarbacher, a physicist and consultant to the Defense Department's Research and Development Board. Other correspondence, having to do with Keyhoe needing to get clearance to publish another article on Smith's theories of UFO propulsion, indicated that Bush and his group were operating out of the Research and Development Board. Smith then briefed superiors in the Canadian government, leading to the establishment of Project Magnet, a small Canadian government UFO research effort. Canadian documents and Smith's private papers were uncovered in the late 1970s, and by 1984, other alleged documents emerged claiming the existence of a highly secret UFO oversight committee of scientists and military people called Majestic 12, again naming Vannevar Bush. Sarbacher was also interviewed in the 1980s and corroborated the information in Smith's memos and correspondence. Throughout the 1950s and early 1960s, Smith granted public interviews, and among other things stated that he had been lent crashed UFO material for analysis by a highly secret U.S. government group which he wouldn't name.

A few weeks after the Robertson Panel, the Air Force issued Regulation 200-2, ordering air base officers to publicly discuss UFO incidents only if they were judged to have been solved, and to classify all the unsolved cases to keep them out of the public eye. In addition, UFO investigative duties started to be taken on by the newly formed 4602nd Air Intelligence Squadron (AISS) of the Air Defense Command. The 4602nd AISS was tasked with investigating only the most important UFO cases having intelligence or national security implications. These were deliberately siphoned away from Blue Book, leaving Blue Book to deal with the more trivial reports.

Keyhoe and The Flying Saucer Conspiracy

In 1955,  Donald Keyhoe authored a new book that pointedly accused elements of the United States government of engaging in a conspiracy to cover up knowledge of flying saucers.  Keyhoe claims the existence of a "silence group" of orchestrating this conspiracy.  Historian of Folklore Curtis Peebles argues:   "The Flying Saucer Conspiracy marked a shift in Keyhoe's belief system. No longer were flying saucers the central theme; that now belonged to the silence group and its coverup. For the next two decades Keyhoe's beliefs about this would dominate the flying saucer myth."

The book features claims of a possible discovery of an "orbiting space base" or a "moon base", knowledge of which might trigger a public panic.   The Flying Saucer Conspiracy also incorporated legends of the Bermuda Triangle disappearances.  Keyhoe sensationalized claims, ultimately stemming from optical illusions, of unusual structures on the moon.

Carl Allen and the Philadelphia Experiment

In 1955, Morris K. Jessup achieved some notoriety with his  book The Case for the UFO, in which he argued that UFOs represented a mysterious subject worthy of further study. Jessup speculated that UFOs were "exploratory craft of 'solid' and 'nebulous' character." Jessup also "linked ancient monuments with prehistoric superscience".

In January 1956, Jessup began receiving a series  of letters from  "Carlos Miguel Allende", later identified as Carl Meredith Allen. "Allende" warned Jessup not to investigate the levitation of UFOs and spun a tale of a dangerous experiment in which Navy Ship was successfully made invisible, only to inexplicably teleport from Philadelphia to Norfolk, Virginia before reappearing back in Philadelphia. The ship's crew was supposed to have suffered various side effects, including insanity, intangibility, and being "frozen" in place.  By 1975, the Philadelphia Experiment was being promoted by paranormal author Charles Berlitz and in 1984, the legend was adapted into a fictional film.

In 1957, Jessup was invited to the Office of Naval Research where he was shown an annotated copy of his book that was filled with handwritten notes in its margins, written with three different shades of blue ink, appearing to detail a debate among three individuals. They discussed ideas about the propulsion for flying saucers, alien races, and express concern that Jessup was too close to discovering their technology.  Jessup noticed the handwriting of the annotations resembled the letters he received from Allen.  (Twelve years later, Allen would say that he authored all of the annotations in order "to scare the hell out of Jessup.")

The Jessup book with Allen's scribbled commentaries gained a life of its own when the Varo Manufacturing Corporation of Garland, Texas, who did contract work for ONR, began producing mimeographed copies of the book with Allen's annotations and Allen's letters to Jessup.  These copies came to be known as the "Varo edition." This became the heart of many "Philadelphia Experiment" books, documentaries, and movies to come. Over the years various writers and researchers who tried to get more information from Carl Allen found his responses elusive, or could not find him at all.

Edward Ruppelt and The Report on Unidentified Flying Objects
Ruppelt was a captain in the US Air Force who served as director of official investigations into UFOs:  Project Grudge and Project Bluebook.

In 1956, Ruppelt authored The Report on Unidentified Flying Objects, a book that has been called the "most significant" of its era.  The book discussed the Twining memo which initiated UFO investigation and the rejected 1948 "Estimate of the Situation". Ruppelt 
criticized the Air Force's handling of UFOs investigations.   Historian Curtis Peebles concludes that the book "should have ended the speculation about an Air Force cover-up. In fact, Ruppelt's statements were converted into support for the cover-up idea."

Gray Barker and the 'Men in Black'

1956 saw the publication of Gray Barker's They Knew Too Much About Flying Saucers, the book which publicized the idea of Men in Black who appear to UFO witnesses and warn them to keep quiet. There has been continued speculation that the men in black are government agents who harass and threaten UFO witnesses.

According to the Skeptical Inquirer article "Gray Barker: My Friend, the Myth-Maker", there may have been "a grain of truth" to Barker's writings on the Men in Black, in that government agencies did attempt to discourage public interest in UFOs during the 1950s. However, Barker is thought to have greatly embellished the facts of the situation. In the same Skeptical Inquirer article, Sherwood revealed that, in the late 1960s, he and Barker collaborated on a brief fictional notice alluding to the Men in Black, which was published as fact first in Raymond A. Palmer's Flying Saucers magazine and some of Barker's own publications. In the story, Sherwood (writing as "Dr. Richard H. Pratt") claimed he was ordered to silence by the "blackmen" after learning that UFOs were time-travelling vehicles. Barker later wrote to Sherwood, "Evidently the fans swallowed this one with a gulp."

1960s

Throughout much of the 1960s, atmospheric physicist James E. McDonald suggested—via lectures, articles and letters—that the U.S. Government was mishandling evidence that would support the extraterrestrial hypothesis.

Jacques Vallee and the "Pentacle Memorandum"
In June 1967, researcher Jacques Vallee was tasked with organizing files collected by Project Bluebook investigator J. Allen Hynek  Among those files, Vallee found a memo dated 9 January 1953 addressed to an assistant of Edward J. Ruppelt, an Air Force officer assigned to Bluebook.  The memo was signed "H.C. Cross", but Vallee elected to refer to the author under the pseudonym "Pentacle".

The memo referred to a previously unknown analysis of several thousand UFO reports, along with calls for agreements about "what can and what cannot be discussed" with the 1953 Roberson Panel.  Writing in his 1967 journal, Vallee expressed the opinion that the memo, if it were published, "would cause an even bigger uproar among foreign scientists than among Americans: it would prove the devious nature of the statements made by the Pentagon all these years about the non-existence of UFOs".

1970s

Emenegger documentary and the landing at Holloman Air Force Base

Clark cites a 1973 encounter as perhaps the earliest suggestion that the U.S. government was involved with ETs. That year, Robert Emenegger and Allan Sandler of Los Angeles, California were in contact with officials at Norton Air Force Base in order to make a documentary film. Emenegger and Sandler report that Air Force Officials (including Paul Shartle) suggested incorporating UFO information in the documentary, including as its centerpiece genuine footage of a 1971 UFO landing at Holloman Air Force Base in New Mexico. Furthermore, says Emenegger, he was given a tour of Holloman AFB and was shown where officials conferred with aliens. This was supposedly not the first time the U.S. had met these aliens, as Emenegger reported that his U.S. military sources had "been monitoring signals from an alien group with which they were unfamiliar, and did their ET guests know anything about them? The ETs said no"  The documentary was released in 1974 as UFOs: Past, Present, and Future (narrated by Rod Serling) containing only a few seconds of the Holloman UFO footage, the remainder of the landing depicted with illustrations and re-enactments.

In 1988, Shartle said that the film in question was genuine, and that he had seen it several times.

In 1976 a televised documentary report UFOs: It Has Begun written by Robert Emenegger was presented by Rod Serling, Burgess Meredith and José Ferrer. Some sequences were recreated based upon the statements of eyewitness observers, together with the findings and conclusions of governmental civil and military investigations. The documentary uses a hypothetical UFO landing at Holloman AFB as a backdrop.

Emenegger's 1973 depiction of a landing at Holloman  is widely noted for its "striking" similarities to Steven Spielberg's 1977 depiction of a landing at Devil's Tower in the film Close Encounters of the Third Kind. In the 2013 documentary Mirage Men, Ufologist Richard Dolan discussed the Emenegger documentary, saying "I have wondered [if] that film, I think as many people have wondered, was an abortive attempt at some kind of 'Disclosure'.

J. Allen Hynek and "Cosmic Watergate"
J. Allen Hynek was an American astronomer who served as scientific advisor to UFO studies undertaken by the U.S. Air Force under three projects: Project Sign (1947–1949), Project Grudge (1949–1951) and Project Blue Book (1952–1969)   Hynek had drawn ridicule for his most famous debunking, in which he suggests a mass-sighting over Michigan may have been caused by "swamp gas".

By 1974, the former skeptic was publicly charging that Bluebook was "a Cosmic Watergate".  Hynek claimed 20% of Bluebook cases were unexplained.  Fellow Ufologist like Stanton Friedman echoed Hynek's "Cosmic Watergate" accusations.

Alternative 3 and a secret space program
Jerome Clark comments that many UFO conspiracy theory tales "can be traced to a mock documentary Alternative 3, broadcast on British television on June 20, 1977 (but intended for April Fools' Day), and subsequently turned into a paperback book."

According to the fictional research presented in the episode, it was claimed that missing scientists were involved in a secret American/Soviet plan in outer space, and further suggested that interplanetary space travel had been possible for much longer than was commonly accepted. The episode featured a fictional Apollo astronaut  who claims to have stumbled on a mysterious lunar base during his moonwalk.

It was claimed that scientists had determined that the Earth's surface would be unable to support life for much longer, due to pollution leading to catastrophic climate change. Physicist "Dr Carl Gerstein" (played by Richard Marner) claimed to have proposed in 1957 that there were three alternatives to this problem. The first alternative was the drastic reduction of the human population on Earth. The second alternative was the construction of vast underground shelters to house government officials and a cross section of the population until the climate had stabilized. The third alternative, the so-called "Alternative 3", was to populate Mars via a way station on the Moon.  The final moments of the film feature the discovery of animal life on the surface of Mars.

Paul Bennewitz

The late 1970s also saw the beginning of controversy centered on Paul Bennewitz of Albuquerque, New Mexico.

1980s

Jesse Marcel and Roswell conspiracy theories

In February 1978, UFO researcher Stanton Friedman interviewed Jesse Marcel, the only person known to have accompanied the Roswell debris from where it was recovered to Fort Worth where reporters saw material that was claimed to be part of the recovered object. Marcel's statements contradicted those he made to the press in 1947.

In November 1979, Marcel's first filmed interview was featured in a documentary titled "UFO's Are Real", co-written by Friedman. The film had a limited release but was later syndicated for broadcasting.
On February 28, 1980, sensationalist tabloid the National Enquirer brought large-scale attention to the Marcel story.  On September 20, 1980, the TV series In Search of... aired an interview where Marcel described his participation in the 1947 press conference:
"They wanted some comments from me, but I wasn't at liberty to do that. So, all I could do is keep my mouth shut. And General Ramey is the one who discussed – told the newspapers, I mean the newsman, what it was, and to forget about it. It is nothing more than a weather observation balloon. Of course, we both knew differently."

Marcel gave a final interview to HBO's America Undercover which aired in August 1985.  In all his statements, Marcel consistently denied the presence of bodies.  Between 1978 and the early 1990s, UFO researchers such as Stanton T. Friedman, William Moore, Karl T. Pflock, and the team of Kevin D. Randle and Donald R. Schmitt interviewed several dozen people who claimed to have had a connection with the events at Roswell in 1947.

In the 1990s, the US military published two reports disclosing the true nature of the crashed aircraft: a surveillance balloon from Project Mogul. Nevertheless, the Roswell incident continues to be of interest to the media, and conspiracy theories surrounding the event persist. Roswell has been described as "the world's most famous, most exhaustively investigated and most thoroughly debunked UFO claim".

Gordon Cooper
By 1981, astronaut Gordon Cooper reported suppression of a flying saucer movie filmed in high clarity by two Edwards AFB range photographers on May 3, 1957. Cooper said he viewed developed negatives of the object, clearly showing a dish-like object with a dome on top and something like holes or ports in the dome. When later interviewed by James McDonald, the photographers and another witness confirmed the story. Cooper said military authorities then picked up the film and neither he nor the photographers ever heard what happened to it. The incident was also reported in a few newspapers, such as the Los Angeles Times. The official explanation was that the photographers had filmed a weather balloon distorted by hot desert air.

Majestic 12

The so-called Majestic 12 documents surfaced in 1982, suggesting that there was secret, high-level U.S. government interest in UFOs dating to the 1940s. Upon examination, the Federal Bureau of Investigation (FBI) declared the documents to be "completely bogus", and many ufologists consider them to be an elaborate hoax.

The term "Extraterrestrial Biological Entities" (or EBEs) was used in the MJ-12 documents.

Linda Moulton Howe and cattle mutilations
Linda Moulton Howe is an advocate of conspiracy theories that cattle mutilations are of extraterrestrial origin and speculations that the U.S. government is involved with aliens.

George C. Andrews and Milton William Cooper
In 1986, conspiracy theorist George C. Andrews authored Extra-Terrestrials Among Us, accusing the CIA of the Kennedy assassination.  Scholar of extremism  Michael Barkun notes that "Andrew's political views are almost indistinguishable from those associated with militias, only his placement of extraterrestrials at the pinnacle of conspiracies identifies him as a ufologist."    According to Barkun,  "the publication of Extra-Terrestrials Among Us marked the beginning of a feverish period of UFO conspiracism, from 1986 to 1989.

Citing Andrews as a source, in 1991 the UFO conspiracy author Bill Cooper published the influential conspiracy work Behold a Pale Horse which claimed that Kennedy was killed after he "informed Majestic 12 that he intended to reveal the presence of aliens to the American people".  Behold a Pale Horse became 'wildly popular' with conspiracy theorists and went on to be one of the most-read books in the US prison system. According to Michael Barkun,  the theories of Andrews and Cooper helped create "a conspiracist form of UFO speculation, which Jerome Clark refers to as ufology's 'dark side'."

Bob Lazar

In November 1989, Bob Lazar appeared in a special interview with investigative reporter George Knapp on Las Vegas TV station KLAS to discuss his alleged employment at S-4. In his interview with Knapp, Lazar said he first thought the saucers were secret, terrestrial aircraft, whose test flights must have been responsible for many UFO reports. Gradually, on closer examination and from having been shown multiple briefing documents, Lazar came to the conclusion that the discs must have been of extraterrestrial origin. He claims that they use moscovium, an element that decays in a fraction of a second, to warp space, and that "Grey" aliens are from the Zeta Reticuli star system. According to the Los Angeles Times, he never obtained the degrees he claims to hold from MIT and Caltech.

UFO Cover-Up?: Live!

On October 14, 1988, actor Mike Farrell hosted U.S. UFO Cover-Up: Live!, a two-hour television special "focusing on the government's handling of information regarding UFOs" and "whether there has been any suppression of evidence supporting the existence of UFOs".

1990s

The Branton Files are a series of documents espousing various conspiracy theories circulated on the internet since at least the mid-1990s. They are most often attributed to Bruce Alan Walton who claims to have been a victim of alien abduction and had contact through "altered states of consciousness" with humans "living in the inner earth". The files have been characterized as "high fantasy" filled with "complex and convoluted conspiracism".

Phil Schneider and Dulce Base
In 1995, a man calling himself Philip Schneider made a few appearances at UFO conventions, espousing essentially a new version of the theories mentioned above.  Schneider claimed to be the son of U-Boat commander who was captured by the allies and switched sides.  According to Schneider, his father has been part of the Philadelphia Experiment.   Schneider claimed to have played a role in the construction of Deep Underground Military Bases (DUMBs) across the United States, and as a result he said that he had been exposed to classified information of various sorts as well as having personal experiences with EBEs. He claimed to have survived the Dulce Base catastrophe and decided to tell his tale.

According to folklore, Schneider died on January 17, 1996, in a death ruled a suicide, though some of his followers reportedly believed he may have been murdered.

2000s
2003 saw the publication of Alien Encounters, by Chuck Missler and Mark Eastman, which primarily re-stated the notions presented above (especially Cooper's) and presents them as fact.

MoD secret files
Eight files from 1978 to 1987 on UFO sightings were first released on May 14, 2008, to the National Archives' website by the British Ministry of Defence. Two hundred files were set to be made public by 2012. The files are correspondence from the public sent to government officials, such as the MoD and Margaret Thatcher. The information can be downloaded. Copies of Lt. Col. Halt's letter regarding the sighting at RAF Woodbridge (see above) to the U.K. Ministry of Defence were routinely released (without additional comment) by the USA's base public affairs staff throughout the 1980s until the base closed. The MoD released the files due to requests under the Freedom of Information Act. The files included reports of "lights in the sky" from Britons.

Disclosure
In the early 2000s, the concept of "disclosure" became increasingly popular in the UFO conspiracy community: that the government had classified and withheld information on alien contact and full disclosure was needed, and was pursued by activist lobbying groups.

In 1993, Steven M. Greer founded the Disclosure Project to promote the concept. In May 2001, Greer held a press conference at the National Press Club in Washington, D.C. that demanded Congress hold hearings on "secret U.S. involvement with UFOs and extraterrestrials". It was described by an attending BBC reporter as "the strangest ever news conference hosted by Washington's august National Press Club". The Disclosure Project's claims were met with by derision by skeptics and spokespeople for the U. S. Air Force.

In 2013, the production company CHD2, LLC held a "Citizen Hearing on Disclosure" at the National Press Club in Washington, D.C. from 29 April to 3 May 2013. The group paid former U.S. Senator Mike Gravel and former Representatives Carolyn Cheeks Kilpatrick, Roscoe Bartlett, Merrill Cook, Darlene Hooley, and Lynn Woolsey $20,000 each to participate, and to preside over panels of academics and former government and military officials discussing UFOs and extraterrestrials.

Other such groups include Citizens Against UFO Secrecy, founded in 1977.

The name of the German website Disclose.tv, which was initially a forum discussing UFOs and other conspiracy theories, references the concept.

Allegations of evidence suppression
Allegations of suppression of UFO related evidence have persisted for many decades. Some conspiracy theories also claim that some governments might have removed and/or destroyed/suppressed physical evidence; some examples follow.

On July 7, 1947, William Rhodes photographed an unusual object over Phoenix, Arizona. The photos appeared in a Phoenix newspaper and a few other papers. An Army Air Force intelligence officer and an FBI agent interviewed Rhodes on August 29 and convinced him to surrender the negatives, which he did the next day. He was informed he would not get them back, but later he tried, unsuccessfully, to retrieve them. The photos were analyzed and subsequently appeared in some classified Air Force UFO intelligence reports. (Randle, 34–45, full account)

A June 27, 1950, movie of a "flying disk" over Louisville, Kentucky, taken by a Louisville Courier-Journal photographer, had the USAF Directors of counterintelligence (AFOSI) and intelligence discussing in memos how to best obtain the movie and interview the photographer without revealing Air Force interest. One memo suggested the FBI be used, then precluded the FBI getting involved. Another memo said "it would be nice if OSI could arrange to secure a copy of the film in some covert manner," but if that was not feasible, one of the Air Force scientists might have to negotiate directly with the newspaper. In a recent interview, the photographer confirmed meeting with military intelligence and still having the film in his possession until then, but refused to say what happened to the film after that.

In another 1950 movie incident from Montana, Nicholas Mariana filmed some unusual aerial objects and eventually turned the film over to the U.S. Air Force, but insisted that the first part of the film, clearly showing the objects as spinning discs, had been removed when it was returned to him.

On January 22, 1958, when NICAP director Donald Keyhoe appeared on CBS television, his statements on UFOs were censored by the Air Force. During the show when Keyhoe tried to depart from the censored script to "reveal something that has never been disclosed before," CBS cut the sound, later stating Keyhoe was about to violate "predetermined security standards" and about to say something he was not "authorized to release." Conspiracy theorists claim that what Keyhoe was about to reveal were four publicly unknown military studies concluding UFOs were interplanetary (including the 1948 Project Sign Estimate of the Situation and Blue Book's 1952 engineering analysis of UFO motion). (Good, 286–287; Dolan 293–295)

A March 1, 1967 memo directed to all USAF divisions, from USAF Lt. General Hewitt Wheless, Assistant Vice Chief of Staff, stated that unverified information indicated that unknown individuals, impersonating USAF officers and other military personnel, had been harassing civilian UFO witnesses, warning them not to talk, and also confiscating film, referring specifically to the Heflin incident. AFOSI was to be notified if any personnel were to become aware of any other incidents. (Document in Fawcett & Greenwood, 236.)

According to one theory related to the assassination of President John F. Kennedy, the CIA killed Kennedy in order to prevent him from leaking information to the Soviet Union about a covert program to reverse-engineer alien technology (i.e., Majestic 12).

Nick Cook, an aviation investigative journalist for Jane's Information Group and researcher of Billion Dollar Secret and author of The Hunt for Zero Point claims to have uncovered documentary evidence that top-secret US Defense Industry technology has been developed by government-backed Defense Industry programs, beginning in the 1940s using research conducted by Nazi scientists during WWII and recovered by Allied Military Intelligence, then taken to the U.S. and developed further with the collaboration of the same former German scientists at top-secret facilities established at White Sands, New Mexico, and later at Area 51, allegedly resulting in production of real-world prototype operational supersonic craft actually tested and used in clandestine military exercises, with other developments incorporated later into spy aircraft tasked with overflying hostile countries: the UFO story that evidence of alien technology is being suppressed and removed or destroyed was generated and then promoted by the CIA, beginning 1947, as false-lead disinformation to cover it all up for the sake of National Security, particularly during the Cold War, at a time when (his investigations found) the Soviet Union too was developing its own top-secret high-tech UFO craft. Cook's conclusions, alleging suppression of evidence of advanced human technology instead of alien, together with what he presents as declassified top-secret documents and blueprints, and his interviews of various experts (some of doubtful reliability), was developed and broadcast as a feature documentary on British television in 2005 as "UFOs: The Secret Evidence" and in the US in 2006 as a two-part episode on the History Channel's UFO Files, retitled "An Alien History of Planet Earth", with an added introduction by actor William Shatner. The History Channel program teaser promised "...a look at rumors of classified military aircraft incorporating alien technology into their designs."

In 2013, Sen. Mike Gravel claimed that the government was suppressing evidence of extraterrestrials.

Benjamin Radford has pointed out how unlikely such suppression of evidence is given that "[t]he UFO coverup conspiracy would have to span decades, cross international borders, and transcend political administrations" and that "all of the world's governments, in perpetuity, regardless of which political party is in power and even among enemies, [would] have colluded to continue the coverup."

In popular fiction
Works of popular fiction have included premises and scenes in which a government intentionally prevents disclosure to its populace of the discovery of non-human, extraterrestrial intelligence. Motion picture examples include 2001: A Space Odyssey (as well as the earlier novel by Arthur C. Clarke), Easy Rider, the Steven Spielberg films Close Encounters of the Third Kind and E.T. the Extra-Terrestrial, Hangar 18, Total Recall, Men in Black, and Independence Day. Television series and films including The X-Files, Dark Skies, and Stargate have also featured efforts by governments to conceal information about extraterrestrial beings. The plot of the Sidney Sheldon novel The Doomsday Conspiracy involves a UFO conspiracy.

In March 2001, former astronaut and United States Senator John Glenn appeared on an episode of the TV series Frasier playing a fictional version of himself who confesses to a UFO coverup.

See also

 Bielefeld Conspiracy
 Brookings Report
 Crop circle
 Flying Saucers
 Kecksburg UFO incident
 List of major UFO sightings
 Magazines of anomalous phenomena
 New World Order (conspiracy)
 Project Blue Book
 Storm Area 51
 The Disclosure Project
 Ummo
 United States gravity control propulsion research (1955–1974)
 Planetary objects proposed in religion, astrology, ufology and pseudoscience

Notes and references 
 Footnotes

 Citations

 Bibliography

Further reading 

 Peebles, Curtis. Watch the Skies! A Chronicle of the Flying Saucer Myth. Washington, DC:Smithsonian Institution, 1994. .

External links
 CIA's Role in the Study of UFOs, 1947–90 
 National Security Agency UFO Documents Index 
 20th Century UFO Conspiracies, a lecture by Emory University Professor Felix Harcourt 

Science and technology-related conspiracy theories
Unidentified flying objects
Ufology